Indie pop (also typeset as indie-pop or indiepop) is a music genre and subculture that combines guitar pop with DIY ethic in opposition to the style and tone of mainstream pop music. It originated from British post-punk in the late 1970s and subsequently generated a thriving fanzine, label, and club and gig circuit. Compared to its counterpart, indie rock, the genre is more melodic, less abrasive, and relatively angst-free. In later years, the definition of indie pop has bifurcated to also mean bands from unrelated DIY scenes/movements with pop leanings. Subgenres include chamber pop and twee pop.

Development and characteristics

Origins and etymology

Both indie and indie pop had originally referred to the same thing during the late 1970s. Inspired more by punk rock's DIY ethos than its style, guitar bands were formed on the then-novel premise that one could record and release their own music instead of having to procure a record contract from a major label. According to Emily Dolan, indie is predicated on the distorted music of the Velvet Underground, the "rebellious screaming" of early punk, and "some of rock's more quirky and eccentric figures", such as Jonathan Richman. Pitchforks Nitsuh Abebe identifies the majority of indie as "all about that 60s-styled guitar jangle".

Indie pop was an unprecedented contrast from the gritty and serious tones of previous underground rock styles, as well as being a departure from the glamour of contemporary pop music. Distinguished from the angst and abrasiveness of its indie rock counterpart, the majority of indie pop borrows not only the stripped-down quality of punk, but also "the sweetness and catchiness of mainstream pop". Music critic Simon Reynolds says that indie pop defines itself against "charting pop". Abebe explains: 

Despite their relatively minor commercial success (their third album was sardonically titled They Could Have Been Bigger than the Beatles), the Television Personalities are highly regarded by critics and have been widely influential, especially on the C86 generation. Reynolds has said that "what we now know as indie music was invented in Scotland," with reference to the emergence of Postcard Records in 1979. However, some have posited that the concept of indie music did not crystallise until the late 1980s and early 1990s. Brisbane band the Go-Betweens were an early influential indie pop band, releasing their first single "Lee Remick" in 1978. American indie pop band Beat Happening's 1985 eponymous debut album was also influential in the development of the indie pop sound, particularly in North America. In the early 1990s, English indie pop influenced and branched off to a variety of styles. The US, which did not have as much of a scene in the 1980s, had many indie pop enthusiasts by the mid 1990s. Most of the modern notion of indie music stems from NMEs 1986 compilation C86, which collects many guitar bands who were inspired by the early psychedelic sounds of 1960s garage rock.

Names that indie pop fans use for themselves are popkids and popgeeks, and for the music they listen to, p!o!p, twee, anorak and C86. Abebe says that the Scottish group the Pastels typified the "hip end of 'anorak': Their lazy melodies, lackadaisical strum, and naive attitude transformed the idea of the rock band into something casual, intimate, and free from the pretense of cool".

Disputed significance of C86
Everett True, a writer for NME in the 1980s, believes that C86 was not the main factor behind indie pop, arguing that Sarah Records was more responsible for sticking to a particular sound, and that: "C86 didn't actually exist as a sound, or style. ... I find it weird, bordering on surreal, that people are starting to use it as a description again". Geoff Taylor, a member of the band Age of Chance, added: "We never considered ourselves part of any scene. I'm not sure that the public at large did either, to be honest. We were just an independent band around at that same time as the others."

Bob Stanley, a Melody Maker journalist in the late 1980s and founding member of pop band Saint Etienne, acknowledges that participants at the time reacted against lazy labelling, but insists they shared an approach: "Of course the 'scene', like any scene, barely existed. Like squabbling Marxist factions, groups who had much in common built up petty rivalries. The June Brides and the Jasmine Minks were the biggest names at Alan McGee's Living Room Club and couldn't stand the sight of each other. Only when the Jesus and Mary Chain exploded and stole their two-headed crown did they realise they were basically soulmates". Manic Street Preachers bassist Nicky Wire remembers that it was the bands' very independence that gave the scene coherence: "People were doing everything themselves - making their own records, doing the artwork, gluing the sleeves together, releasing them and sending them out, writing fanzines because the music press lost interest really quickly."

Many of the actual C86 bands distanced themselves from the scene cultivated around them by the UK music press - in its time, C86 became a pejorative term for its associations with so-called "shambling" (a John Peel-coined description celebrating the self-conscious primitive approach of some of the music) and underachievement.

Related genres

Twee pop

Twee pop is a subgenre of indie pop that originates from C86. Characterised by its simplicity and perceived innocence, some of its defining features are boy-girl harmonies, catchy melodies, and lyrics about love. For many years, most bands were distributed by Sarah Records (in the UK) and K Records (in the US).

Shibuya-kei 

 is a Japanese style from the 1990s that was embraced by indie pop enthusiasts, partly because many of its bands were distributed in the United States through major indie labels like Matador and Grand Royal. Out of all the Japanese groups from the scene, Pizzicato Five was the closest to achieving mainstream success in the US.

Chamber pop

Chamber pop is a subgenre of indie pop that features lush orchestrations. Heavily influenced by Brian Wilson and Burt Bacharach, the majority of Louis Phillipe's productions for él Records embodied the sophisticated use of orchestras and voices that typified the style, whilst the Divine Comedy were the most popular chamber pop act of the Britpop era.

See also 
 List of indie pop artists

References

Works cited

Further reading
 Fonarow, Wendy,  "Empire of Dirt, The Aesthetics and Rituals of British Indie Music" 2006
 Hann, Michael, Fey city rollers (The Guardian, 2004)
 Pearce, Kevin, A Different Story: The Ballad of the June Brides (Tangents, 2001)
 Rogers, Jude, Smells like indie spirit (The Observer, 2007)
 Stanley, Bob, Where were you in C86? (The Times, 2006)

External links
TweeNet - indiepop reference web site
INDIE POP BR - Brazilian indie pop music reference web site

 
British styles of music
Pop music genres
20th-century music genres
Musical subcultures
DIY culture
British rock music genres